Nilufar Usmanova (born 6 April 1987) is an Uzbek singer and actress. She received primary education in school number 18 (in Margilan) and number 17 (in Tashkent). At age 10 her parents sent her to the United Kingdom, where during four years she studied in educational institutions such as the Vinehall School (1996–1999) and Sherborne International College (1999–2000). In 2001 Nilufar returned to Uzbekistan, entered to the Tashkent Ulugbek International School and finished it in 2004.In 2006, Nilufar, aiming to become lawyer, started studying in Tashkent State Law University and graduated in 2013.

Personal life
In 2004, Nilufar Usmanova married a young lawyer Novzod Saidgaziev. In 2004, they had a son, Saidazam, and in the same year, the couple got divorced. In 2009 Nilufar married for the second time. From this marriage, in 2011 she gave birth to a son Ibrahim, and in 2012 to another son called Suleiman. In 2019, she changed her name to Aisha.

Career 
At the age of 8 Nilufar sang her first song  "Shaytonga buysungan yuraklar" in a duet with her mother Yulduz Usmanova. In 1995, video for the song "Shaytonga buysungan yuraklar" was released and in the same year, as part of a solo concert of Yulduz Usmanova, Nilufar first appeared on a big stage, debuting with her mother. In 1995 she starred in the leading role in the movie Bolajon with Uzbek actor Mirza Holmedov and her mother Yulduz Usmanova. In 2002 and 2003, she starred in such films as Muhabbat sinovlari (Trials of love) and Muhabbat sinovlari – 2 (trials of love 2).

Her professional career began in 2005 with the release of the song "Bolam shu yurt seniki" (My child this land is yours). In 2006 she signed a contract with Tarona Records company and in the same year Nilufar had the title role in the film Burilar (Wolves). In 2007, the song "Taslim buldim" (I gave up) was released, which later became a hit. In the same year she presented another hit "Bir Kuning Baxsh et" (Devote one your days). In 2008, the first studio album was recorded, "Taslim Buldim!" (I gave up) and new single "Bevafo yorim" (Untrustworthy lover). In 2009, there was the release of the second studio album Bahtingni kutgin (Wait for your happiness) most singles of which were performed in duets with domestic singers (with Otabek Mutalhodzhaev "Mayli, mayli," (Alright) with Akbar Atamuhammedov (band "Sado") "Voy-Doda" (Oh My God) with Shahruhhon "Senga bulsin!" (Let it be for you) and with Shahriyor). In the same year she recorded the song "Uchar kiz" (Flying girl) (Yalanci şahidim).

In 2010 and 2011, she released such songs as "Farishtalar" (Angels) (a soundtrack for the film Poyma poy), "Tasanno" (Bravo), "Khayolim ugrisi" (Robber of my mind), "Serobginam" (My plentiful), "Karay olasanmi?" (Can you look at?). Next year 2012 was marked with the premiere of singles and videos, "Jani", "Qayt" (Come back), duets "Aytishuv" (Battle) with Doniyar Bekturdiev (singer from Khorezm) and "Illo" with Yulduz Usmanova. In 2013 she recorded singles and made videos "Ana-ana" (Here it is) and "Kadrimga et" (Appreciate me), "Hey bola" (Hey guy), "Unutgin" (Forget).
2014: "Chapanigina Uzbegim" (My common Uzbek), "Kuyla-kuyla" (Sing-sing). On 31 January and 1 February 2015 in Istanbul (Turkey) Nilufar Usmanova performed with the concert program. In the spring of 2015 there were two videos made for the song "Maktab" (School) and "Dunyo" (World). In June there were video shoots for the song "Bir donang bulay" (Let me be your only one), the video was released in July 2015.

Discography

Filmography
This is a chronologically-ordered list of films in which Nilufar has appeared.

Music videos

Awards

References

External links

General references

 https://web.archive.org/web/20150925102333/http://bazm.uz/Tamada-i-Artisti/Artisti/Nilufar-Usmanova---Nilufar-Usmonova/9-36-0-1392-0-0.html
 http://sahro.net/news/1366-prazdnik-syna-i-novaya-pesnya-nilufar-usmanovoy.html
 http://myday.uz/koncerti-shou/nilyufar-usmanova-pozdravila-vipusknikov
 http://myday.uz/koncerti-shou/premyera-klipa-nilyufar-usmanovoy-na-vevo
 https://web.archive.org/web/20150722144219/http://kun.uz/2015/06/02/nilufar-usmonovaning-yangi-videoklipi-vevo-telekanali-orqali-namoyish-qilindi/
 https://web.archive.org/web/20150723165049/http://kun.uz/2015/06/08/nilufar-usmonova-bolalar-uchun-kongilochar-open-air-dasturini-tashkil-qildi/
 http://www.afisha.uz/media/2015/06/26/nilyufar-usmanova-prezentuet-klip-i-opredelyaet-pobediteleyy/
 http://www.afisha.uz/gorod/2015/06/09/detskiy-prazdnik-navozduhe/
 http://www.afisha.uz/media/2015/06/04/nilufar/
 http://www.afisha.uz/photo/2015/06/26/premera-klipa-maktab-ipodvedenie-itogov-konkursa-m2015/
 http://www.afisha.uz/photo/2015/05/26/proschay-shkola-zdravstvuy-kolledzh/
 http://shou-biznes.uz/yangiliklar/ozbek-kinosi/ada-emas-dada-film-premerasidan-avval-diski-sotuvda.html
 http://shou-biznes.uz/yangiliklar/ozbek-kinosi/ada-emas-dada-filmini-qachon-koramiz.html
 https://bisyor.cc/tags/Nilufar+Usmonova/

1987 births
Musicians from Tashkent
Living people
Actors from Tashkent
Turkvision Song Contest entrants
Uzbekistani film actresses
21st-century Uzbekistani women singers
20th-century Uzbekistani actresses
21st-century Uzbekistani actresses